Wind It Up may refer to:

 "Wind It Up (Rewound)", a 1993 single by The Prodigy
 "Wind It Up" (Barenaked Ladies song), 2006
 "Wind It Up" (Gwen Stefani song), 2006
 "Wind It Up", Todrick Hall featuring Vonzell Solomon song from the soundtrack of MTV's Todrick, 2015